is the debut full-length studio album by the Japanese rock band One Ok Rock, released on November 21, 2007. It peaked at No. 15 on the Oricon weekly chart and charted for 22 weeks before dropping out.

Track listing

Charts

Weekly charts

Singles

Certifications

Personnel
One Ok Rock
 Takahiro "Taka" Moriuchi — lead vocals
 Toru Yamashita — rap vocals, rhythm guitar
 Alexander "Alex" Reimon Onizawa — lead guitar
 Ryota Kohama — bass guitar
 Tomoya Kanki — drums, percussion

References

2007 debut albums
One Ok Rock albums
Amuse Inc. albums